Dufauxia is a genus of beetles in the family Cerambycidae, containing the following species:

 Dufauxia guaicurana Lane, 1955
 Dufauxia kourouana Lane, 1970
 Dufauxia simplex Martins & Galileo, 2003
 Dufauxia thomasi Martins & Galileo, 2007
 Dufauxia trichocera Monné & Magno, 1990
 Dufauxia zikani Lane, 1970

References

Acanthoderini